The GE U17C diesel-electric locomotive was introduced by GE Transportation as an export model roadswitcher in 1973.
Easy to spot due to its relatively short length —  — it was powered by the 8-cylinder FDL-8T engine.
Very similar to the U18B, it included an extended body section to house a larger air filter and cooling units.

Original purchasers included Syria's CFS,and the Lebanese national railway company.

The GE U17C is also used on the Aqaba Railway Corporation for transporting phosphates from the Mines to Aqaba.

Original Owners

References 

 
 
 
 
 
 

U17C
C-C locomotives
Diesel-electric locomotives of Lebanon
Diesel-electric locomotives of Syria
Railway locomotives introduced in 1973
Standard gauge locomotives of Syria